Ravi Sood (born July 5, 1976) is a Canadian financier and venture capitalist. Sood was raised in Waterloo, Ontario and resides in Hong Kong. He received a bachelor's degree in mathematics from the University of Waterloo. He is the co-founder and former CEO of Navina Asset Management and its predecessor company Lawrence Asset Management, which at its peak controlled over $800 million in assets globally. On August 6, 2010, Sood sold Navina to Aston Hill Financial. and moved on to focus on other endeavors.

Sood has also founded several businesses operating in emerging markets, including Buchanan Renewables, Feronia Inc., Jade Power Trust, and Galane Gold.

Sood became well known in Canada as a regular TV personality and frequent guest host of the Business News Network's evening news programme "Squeeze Play".  He is best known for commenting in the media on the income trust sector, global markets, natural resources and agriculture.

References

1976 births
Businesspeople from Waterloo, Ontario
Canadian financial businesspeople
Canadian people of Indian descent
Living people
University of Waterloo alumni